Eijun Linda Cutts (born 1947) is a Sōtō Zen priest practicing in the lineage of Shunryu Suzuki, a Senior Dharma Teacher at the San Francisco Zen Center. Cutts is a Dharma heir of Tenshin Reb Anderson, having received Dharma transmission from him in 1996. She served as co-abbess of the San Francisco Zen Center from 2000 to 2007, and had first begun practice at the San Francisco Zen Center in 1971; later, she was ordained a priest by Zentatsu Richard Baker in 1975. Currently living at Green Gulch Farm Zen Center, as abbess she had been  aware of the significance in being a woman in a leadership position in religion that has historically been a patriarchy. In this vein, within her first year as abbess she instituted the ceremony in which female ancestors could be honored. She became Central Abbess of San Francisco Zen Center in 2014.

See also
Buddhism in the United States
Timeline of Zen Buddhism in the United States

Notes

References

Clergy from Minneapolis
San Francisco Zen Center
Soto Zen Buddhists
Zen Buddhist priests
1947 births
Living people
American Zen Buddhists
Buddhist abbesses
Buddhist feminists
American feminists
Religious leaders from the San Francisco Bay Area
Women Buddhist priests